2020 U.S. Open may refer to:

2020 U.S. Open (golf), a major golf tournament
2020 US Open (tennis), a grand slam tennis event
2020 U.S. Open Cup, a planned soccer tournament not held due to the COVID-19 pandemic